Kengir (Keñgır) is a village in central Kazakhstan. During the Soviet era, a prison labor camp of Steplag division of Gulag in Kazakhstan was set up adjacent to it. The camp, which was situated near the central-Kazakhstan city of Dzhezkazgan, near the Kara-Kengir River, and held approximately 5,200 prisoners, was the scene of a notable prisoner uprising in the summer of 1954 (see Kengir uprising). After the camp was closed, a large automotive depot was placed there.

See also
Vorkuta uprising
List of Gulag camps

Notes

References

Kulchik, Josip, Seagulls of Kengir ("Chaiki Kingiru", in Ukrainian), Lviv, 2000.

Populated places in Karaganda Region
Aleksandr Solzhenitsyn
Camps of the Gulag
Kazakh Soviet Socialist Republic